The 2015 FIBA Africa Under-16 Championship for Women was the 4th FIBA Africa U16 Championship for Women, played under the rules of FIBA, the world governing body for basketball, and the FIBA Africa thereof. The tournament was hosted by Madagascar from July 11 to 19, with the games played at the Palais des Sports Mahamasina in Antananarivo.

Mali defeated Nigeria – in the final to win their fourth title in a row. and securing a spot at the 2016 U-17 World Cup.

Squads

Draw

Preliminary round 
Times given below are in UTC+3.

Group A

Group B

Knockout stage 
All matches were played at the: Palais des Sports Mahamasina, Antananarivo

5th place bracket

Quarter finals

5-8th classification

Semifinals

7th place match

5th place match

Bronze medal match

Final

Final standings

Mali rosterAssetou Bagayoko, Assetou Sissoko, Astan Diarra, Awa Sidibe, Djeneba Sangare, Mariam Diabate, Mariam Drame, Mariam Traore, Nafatoumata Haidara, Rokia Doumbia, Safiatou Mariko, Salimatou Kourouma, Coach: Oumarou Sidiya

Awards

All-Tournament Team
 G  Rita James
 G  Chanaya Pinto
 F  Regina Pequeno
 F  Rokia Doumbia MVP
 C  Bella Murekatete

Statistical Leaders

Individual Tournament Highs

Points

Rebounds

Assists

2-point field goal percentage

3-point field goal percentage

Free throw percentage

Steals

Blocks

Turnovers

Individual Game Highs

Team Tournament Highs

Points

Rebounds

Assists

Steals

Blocks

Fouls

2-point field goal percentage

3-point field goal percentage

Free throw percentage

Team Game highs

See also
 2015 FIBA Africa Championship for Women

External links
Official Website at FIBA.com

References

2015
Under-16 Championship for Women
FIBA Africa Under-16 Championship for Women
International basketball competitions hosted by Madagascar
FIBA Africa Under-16 Championship for Women
FIBA Africa Under-16 Championship for Women